Marin Prpić (born 8 December 1976 in Rijeka) is a retired Croatian football player who played for Orijent, Zadar, Pomorac and Rijeka in the Croatian First Football League. He also played for several clubs in the Croatian second and third divisions.

Prpić scored a hat-trick for Rijeka in a 4–1 win over Cibalia on 30 July 2005. With 10 goals to his account, he was also the top-scorer for Pomorac during the 2001–02 Croatian First Football League season.

References

External links
 
 

1976 births
Living people
Croatian footballers
Croatian Football League players
HNK Rijeka players
HNK Orijent players
NK Pomorac 1921 players
NK Zadar players
NK Karlovac players
HNK Segesta players
NK Krk players
Footballers from Rijeka
Association football midfielders